The Chaki Wardak Dam, or simply the Chak Dam, is a dam near the Chak district center in Chaki Wardak District, Wardak Province, Afghanistan.  It was originally built by Germans in 1938, making it the oldest major dam in the country.  It regulates flow of the Logar River, helping provide irrigation water in Chak Valley.

Hydropower
Wardak used to have a significant energy-generating capacity with the dam in Chaki Wardak. The
four turbines could provide electricity to Wardak, and parts of Kabul, Logar and Ghazni provinces.

Maintenance
In May 2005 the Chaki Wardak Dam nearly overflowed as its main and emergency floodgates were rusted shut after six years of dry weather.  The UN Development Programme, the Afghanistan Emergency Trust Fund, and the Ministry of Energy and Water, took emergency action to address the threat. The co-operative effort saw a rapid response through immediate financing, planning and implementation of a 16-metre ancillary gate that could hold the water while the rusted gates were lifted and repaired.  The repairs were successful at a reported cost of US$18,000 allowing evacuated residents to return to their homes in the valley.

See also
List of dams and reservoirs in Afghanistan
Water supply in Afghanistan

References

External links
Afghanistan: UNDP assists in flood prevention at Chak-e Wardak Dam 
Afghanistan's Melting Snows Kill 14, Displace Thousands 

Dams in Afghanistan
River regulation in Afghanistan
Water supply and sanitation in Afghanistan
Dams completed in 1938
1938 establishments in Afghanistan